The Telangana football team is an Indian football team representing Telangana in Indian state football competitions including the Santosh Trophy.

The team was first created in 2014. They debuted during the 2015–16 Santosh Trophy qualification season.

Hyderabad
They have appeared in the Santosh Trophy finals 4 times, and have won the trophy twice. Until 1959, the team competed as Hyderabad football team when the Hyderabad Football Association was merged with the Andhra Football Association to establish the combined team.

Honours

State
 Hyderabad
 Santosh Trophy
 Winners (2): 1956–57, 1957–58
 Runners-up (2): 1949–50, 1950–51

Others
 Hyderabad FA
 DCM Trophy
 Runners-up (1): 1954

See also
Telangana Football Association

References

Football in Telangana
Santosh Trophy teams
Organizations with year of establishment missing